Paul Ditisheim (1868–1945) was a Swiss watchmaker, inventor and industrialist.

Early years

Paul Ditisheim was born into a wealthy family in 1868 in La Chaux-de-Fonds. The Ditisheims belonged to the small social circle of industrialist families that were at the forefront of the Swiss watch industry of the time. His father Gaspard and uncle Maurice Ditisheim (or Ditesheim) were the founders of the established watch company Vulcain, one of the many watch companies started by Jewish families in the region. 

Ditisheim studied at the Ecole Industrielle and the Horological School of La Chaux-de-Fonds and worked in his family’s company Vulcain until 1892, when he founded his own brands: Solvil (whose items were often signed Paul Ditisheim) and Titus (whose items were generally marked separately).

Innovation and success
Paul Ditisheim developed a new generation of chronometers, improving them through his studies on the impact of atmospheric pressure and magnetic fields. He invented the affix balance. By 1903, his watches were awarded by the Kew and Neuchâtel Observatories contests. In 1912, he won the world’s chronometric record of the Royal Kew Observatory. He also worked closely with Physics Nobel prize winner Charles-Edouard Guillaume and has been considered "the father of the modern chronometers". According to Professor M. Andrade of the Besançon Astronomical Observatory, Ditisheim’s work “constitutes the most important progress of modern chronometry”.

Later life

In the 1920's, Paul Ditisheim handed over the Solvil et Titus and Paul Ditisheim brands to wealthy Swiss entrepreneurs and captain of industry Paul Bernard Vogel. Vogel, heir to a family of industrialists and married to the heiress of the prominent Eberard family, was also a member of the Swiss watch industry’s elite. Vogel moved the company headquarters to Geneva which boosted the company's size and popularity, which expanded business throughout the world. 

In 1925, having sold his company, Ditisheim left La Chaux-de-Fonds and moved to Paris, where he worked with an earth oils chemist to research and develop watch and clock oils. Paul Ditisheim was still in Paris when France was invaded by the Germans during World War II. Persecuted for being a Jew, he fled to Nice, where he lived until a year before his death.

He died in Geneva in 1945, aged 76.

References

1868 births
1945 deaths
People from La Chaux-de-Fonds
Swiss Jews
Swiss watchmakers (people)